William of Paris may refer to:

William of Paris, an alternative name of William of Æbelholt (c. 1127 – 1203), French-born churchman of Denmark
 William of Auvergne (bishop), d. 1249, sometimes referred to as William of Paris
William of Paris (inquisitor) confessor of Philip IV of France, made inquisitor of France in 1305